Esther Lewis may refer to:
 Esther Lewis (missionary)
 Esther Lewis (poet)
 Esther Lewis (abolitionist)